Incarcerated is the fifth studio album by American rapper Lil Boosie. It was released on September 28, 2010, by Asylum Records, Trill Entertainment, Bad Azz and Warner Bros. Records. The album features guest appearances from Webbie, Foxx, Mouse, Lil' Phat, Lil Trill and Shell, who is the member from the group 3 Deep.

This is the only album he released while he was incarcerated in the Louisiana State Penitentiary.

Singles
The album's lead single, "Better Not Fight" featuring Webbie, Lil' Trill and Foxx, was released on August 17, 2010.

Commercial performance
The album debuted at number 13 on the US Billboard 200 chart, selling 30,000 copies in its first week. As of May 2015, the album has sold 146,000 copies in the United States.

Track listing

References

2010 albums
Lil Boosie albums
Asylum Records albums
Warner Records albums